Dismidila is a genus of moths of the family Crambidae.

Species
Dismidila abrotalis (Walker, 1859)
Dismidila atoca Dyar, 1914
Dismidila drepanoides Munroe, 1970
Dismidila gnoma Munroe, 1970
Dismidila halia (Druce, 1900)
Dismidila hermosa Munroe, 1970
Dismidila obscura Munroe, 1970
Dismidila pallida Munroe, 1970
Dismidila regularis Munroe, 1970
Dismidila similis Munroe, 1970
Dismidila tocista Dyar, 1918
Dismidila vivashae Schaus, 1933

References

Midilinae
Crambidae genera
Taxa named by Harrison Gray Dyar Jr.